Mikhaylovskaya is a rural locality (a village) in Vinogradovsky District, Arkhangelsk Oblast, Russia. The population was 25 as of 2010.

Geography 
Mikhaylovskaya is located on the Tyoda River, 80 km southeast of Bereznik (the district's administrative centre) by road. Zauytovskaya is the nearest rural locality.

References 

Rural localities in Vinogradovsky District